The 2020 Ethiopia bus attack was a mass shooting on a bus in western Ethiopia on 14 November 2020. It occurred in Benishangul-Gumuz Region, as the bus was travelling between Wenbera and Chagni in the context of the wider Metekel conflict. The attack left at least 34 people dead.

See also
Benishangul-Gumuz conflict

References

2020 mass shootings in Africa
2020 murders in Ethiopia
Benishangul-Gumuz Region
Ethiopian civil conflict (2018–present)
Mass murder in 2020
2020 bus attack
November 2020 crimes in Africa
Terrorist incidents against transport in Africa
Terrorist incidents in Africa in 2020
2020 bus attack
Massacres of Amhara people